Dextellia dorsilineella is a moth of the family Gracillariidae. It is known from Spain, Italy, Greece, Malta, Turkmenistan, Israel, the Palestinian Territory, as well as Morocco and Tunisia.

References

Gracillariinae
Moths of Europe
Moths of Asia
Moths of Africa